The Affe mit Schädel ("Ape with skull") is a famous work by the late-19th-century German sculptor Hugo Rheinhold. The statuette is otherwise known as the Affe, einen Schädel betrachtend ("Monkey viewing or contemplating a skull"). It was first exhibited in 1893 at the Große Berliner Kunstaustellung (Great Berlin Art Exhibition).

Description
A common chimpanzee (Pan troglodytes) is sitting atop a pile of books and manuscripts. The subject is holding in its right hand a human skull, echoing the scene in Shakespeare's Hamlet where the Prince of Denmark mourns Yorick ("Alas, poor Yorick! I knew him…"). The chimpanzee cradles its chin with a hand in a contemplative posture. Sitting with its left leg supporting the right, the right leg holds the calipers in its foot. A spine of one of the closed books reads "Darwin".

The book open at the feet and facing the viewer has a single inscription on the right hand page: "eritis sicut deus" from Genesis 3.5 when the serpent is enticing Eve to eat of the Tree of Knowledge of Good and Evil in the Garden of Eden against the Lord's command, promising "And ye shall be as God [knowing good and evil]"), however the second half of this quote is missing, ripped from the lower half of the page.

Motivation
What inspired Rheinhold in making his sculpture is unknown, although it has obvious parallels with Auguste Rodin’s The Thinker. It is perhaps surprising to discover that while Rodin had developed his statue as early as 1880, it was not cast into bronze and displayed until after the Affe mit Schädel had debuted.

Interpretation
The excised Biblical quote possibly suggests good and evil cannot be known, or told apart. With the ape's study, the library of books and the caliper instruments, the suggestion is the statue is warning against the application of rationalism in the absence of morality. Furthermore, when a human is depicted holding a skull, it is usually a comment on mortality (see memento mori) and the inevitability of death; famously, Hamlet bereaves Yorick in one instance, but is soon repulsed by this macabre souvenir as it brings him face-to-face with all life's grim destiny. But, for Hugo Rheinhold's ape, it is something quite different. The ape is engaged in assessment and measurement (confirmed by the calipers). That we should even consider this level of intelligence in another species is a bold examination of ourselves through eyes that bear witness to the disproportionate leverage historically awarded humankind. Hugo Rheinhold's original inscription "eritis sicut deus" (sometimes wrongly "eritus …."), either suggests Darwinian understanding may lead to Frankenstinian abuse of life's essence, or a more inclusive innocence that recognises a place for other advanced life‑forms on our intellectual podium, if only we can just accommodate those guests. The page on which the Book of Genensis quote eritis sicut deus (“You will be like God”) is written is torn with the second part Scientes bonum et malum ("knowing good from evil") lost. Hugo was sympathetic to Darwinian ideas but familiar with Goethe's Faust, where the same quote appears with a warning on the misuse of man's power of reason, the calipers being symbolic of the scientific method.

Reproduction
While debuting at the Große Berliner Kunstaustellung, the Affe mit Schädel became noticed by the Gladenbeck foundry (set up by Carl Gustav Hermann Gladenbeck in 1851). Purchasing the rights to the statue, the foundry featured it as a bronze in their catalogue, and it became popular through its quirky originality. The 30 cm full-size moulds disappeared with the closure of the Gladenbeck foundry, but Bildgießerei Seiler GmbH obtained the 13 cm Gladenbeck casting mould (Nr. 1194).

Distribution
Gladenbeck editions of the statue are displayed at the Institute of Evolutionary Biology, University of Edinburgh, Aberdeen’s Medico-Chirurgical Society, the Boston Medical Library and the Medical Library of Queen’s University in Kingston, Ontario, and also in Calgary, Cottbus, Gloucester, Kerikeri, Munnekeburen, Oakville, Osaka, Oxford, Salem am Bodensee, Stevens Point, Vienna, and famously on Lenin’s desk in the Kremlin. One was even salvaged from a World War II Junkers 88 at the bottom of Lake Attersee (Austria).

Variations
Two foundries (Seiler in Germany, Powderhall in Scotland) still produce faithfully accurate editions of the statue. These editions differ in size (13cm and 30cm, respectively) and patinas (a light traditional bronze, and a much darker penny bronze, respectively).
Other versions less faithful to the original mutate the chimp's pensive contemplation to head‑scratching bewilderment, or sacrifice metallic lustre by substitution of cheaper materials (e.g., clay), and often undermine the sculpture's poise with careless positioning of a plastic skull. Prices currently range from $10 to $4,500. When they do rarely surface in auction or through private sale, Gladenbeck pieces can fetch up to $6,000.

Citations

External links
 
 The Darwin Monkey Bronze Statue after Hugo Rheinhold
 Hugo Rheinhold ... and his Philosophizing Monkey
 Varieties of Rheinhold's Philosophizing Darwin Monkey
 Hugo's Philosophical Ape
 Rheinhold, Hugo (The Jewish Encyclopedia)
 Hugo Rheinhold's monkey

German sculpture
Figurines
Chimpanzees in art
Skulls in art
Books in art
Apes in popular culture
Animal sculptures